José Pedro Ferradeira dos Santos (born 24 January 1995) known as Vinícius, is a Portuguese footballer who plays for Anadia as a defender.

Football career
On 23 August 2014, Vinícius made his professional debut with Académico Viseu in a 2014–15 Segunda Liga match against Benfica B.

Personal
He is the younger brother of Tó Barbosa.

References

External links

Stats and profile at LPFP 

1995 births
People from Póvoa de Varzim
Living people
Portuguese footballers
Association football defenders
Liga Portugal 2 players
Académico de Viseu F.C. players
AD Oliveirense players
S.C. Coimbrões players
Padroense F.C. players
A.D. Sanjoanense players
F.C. Penafiel players
Anadia F.C. players
Campeonato de Portugal (league) players
Sportspeople from Porto District